Old Sacramento State Historic Park occupies around one third of the property within the Old Sacramento Historic District of Sacramento, California.  The Old Sacramento Historic District is a U.S. National Historic Landmark District.  The Historic District is sometimes abbreviated as Old Sacramento, or Old Sac,  and since the 1960s has been restored and developed as a significant tourist attraction.

History
The city of Sacramento grew up in the mid-nineteenth century as a development from Sutter's Fort.  However, the Fort was some distance from the Sacramento River, which was the main means of transport to the coast of California, and the area that would become the modern city developed along the waterfront.

Before Sacramento's extensive levee system was in place, the area flooded quite regularly. Because of this, the city's streets were raised a level. Most of the sidewalks and storefronts have been filled in; however, many tunnels still remain throughout Old Sacramento and the downtown area.

By the 1960s, the area had fallen into disrepair and disrepute. A large effort was made to secure the area's future as an outdoor living history center similar to Colonial Williamsburg in Virginia. Several historically significant buildings were moved or reconstructed. Those that were beyond repair were demolished.

Today, the Old Sacramento Historic District covers the area between the river frontage and Interstate 5, between I Street and the Capitol Mall. The State Historic Park comprises about a third of the total acreage of the district including half of the waterfront, a large grassy area and railroad features.  Virtually all the buildings in this area date from the 19th century, the most notable dating back to the period immediately after the disastrous fire of 1852, and show a reasonable approximation of their original appearance, though they have required varying degrees of reconstruction to restore to them to that state.  However, few if any still serve their original purpose, most of them now house restaurants, gift shops, or other businesses catering to tourists.

Old Sacramento State Historic Park attracts over 5 million visitors annually. Regular events include the Sacramento Music Festival (formerly known as the Sacramento Jazz Jubilee), Gold Rush Days, New Year's Eve events, the St. Patrick's Day Parade, the World Music and Dance Festival and Mardi Gras.

Architecture

While the architecture from this period is commonly attributed to Victorian gold miners, characteristics of West End, such as multi-storied buildings, large arched doorways, full-height balcony windows and the use of decorative wrought-iron balconies, were most ubiquitous in parts of Spain and the Spanish colonies. This influence may be attributed to the fact that the period of Spanish, then Mexican, rule in California enjoyed immigration from all over the Atlantic, including Spain and the Canary Islands, and the Spanish colonies.

The architecture of Old Town Sacramento (formerly known as West End) exhibits observable characteristics similar to that of San Juan (Puerto Rico), Havana (Cuba), Tampico (Mexico), Seville (Spain), Santa Cruz de Teneriffe (Canary Islands), Madrid (Spain).

While the architectural style of Old Sacramento, with its wrought iron balconies and evenly spaced full-height windows may remind one of Paris, Sacramento's oldest buildings predate the Haussmann Projects that renovated large areas of Paris in that style.

Historic buildings
Notable buildings include:
B. F. Hastings Building, the National Historic Landmarked western terminal of the Pony Express and the first location of the California Supreme Court; also housed the office of the Alta California Telegraph Company; features a branch of the Wells Fargo History Museum
Big Four House, a National Historic Landmarked building constructed through the joint efforts of California's railroad pioneers: Collis Huntington, Mark Hopkins, Leland Stanford and Charles Crocker, known as The Big Four.
Lady Adams Building - oldest non-residential building in Old Sacramento and is California Historical Landmark No. 603.
Sacramento Engine Company No. 3, the oldest remaining firehouse in Sacramento
The Firehouse Restaurant (1853), redbrick firehouse; (1960) restaurant
Old Sacramento Schoolhouse Museum
Eagle Theatre - only survived from 1849 to 1850 but has been reconstructed
 Booth Buildings hens 
 Booth's residence on Front Street, the first U.S. governor's mansion in California. 
 Morse Building
The first two are also individually designated National Historic Landmarks.

Memorials

The district contains many memorials to the founders of the city and of the California and transcontinental railroad and other transport systems, including the Theodore Judah monument and the Pony Express Statue.

Current attractions
Old Sacramento is the site of the California State Railroad Museum, the California State Military Museum, the Sacramento History Museum, the Wells Fargo History Museum and the Old Sacramento Interpretive Center.

Other attractions available for visitors include rides in horse-drawn carriages, historic trains from the former Central Pacific Railroad passenger station, and cruises on historic riverboats.  A historic sternwheel riverboat, the Delta King, is moored in the river and serves as a hotel, restaurant and theater.  Riverfront Park located north of J street allows access to the waters edge.

The Sacramento Valley Rail Station is just a short walk away.

Interpretive programs

The Old Sacramento Historical Foundation manages several programs to highlight the history of the city, including historical reenactments by costumed docents, as well as tours of Old Sacramento's underground level. During October, there is also a special Halloween themed ghost tour.

Every Labor Day weekend, Old Sacramento holds its annual Gold Rush Days. During this time, the paved streets are covered with several tons of dirt and automobile traffic is barred from the area. Old Sac's regular corps of costumed docents is supplemented by extra volunteers and professional reenactors to recreate life in Sacramento as it was in the mid to late 1800s.

References

External links

Old Sacramento State Historic Park - official site
Old Sacramento Living History Program

 
California Historical Landmarks
California State Historic Parks
Geography of Sacramento, California
Historic districts on the National Register of Historic Places in California
History museums in California
Museums in Sacramento, California
National Historic Landmarks in California
National Register of Historic Places in Sacramento, California
Open-air museums in California
Parks in Sacramento County, California
Protected areas established in 1965
Railroad-related National Historic Landmarks